Climate change in Guatemala is a serious issue because Guatemala is considered one of the 10 nations which is most vulnerable to the effects of climate change. In 2010, Guatemala "ranked second in the world on the Global Climate Risk Index, which indicates the level of exposure and vulnerability to extreme events." Both commercial agricultural production and subsistence farming have declined, and thus subsistence farmers find it more difficult to find work as day laborers when their own harvests fail.  About 300,000 subsistence farmers reported crop loss due to drought in 2018. About half of Guatemala's workforce is in the agricultural sector. Poor crop yields due to climate change have been identified as a factor in migration to the United States.

Greenhouse gas emissions 
"Guatemala emitted 40 million metric tons (MtCO2e) of greenhouse gases in 2011, with the land-use change and forestry sector contributing 40 percent to overall emissions. Greenhouse gas emissions grew by 38 percent from 1990 - 2011 with significant contribution from the land-use change and forestry, energy and agriculture sectors."

Impacts on the natural environment

Temperature and weather changes 

A report by the Guatemalan System of Climate Change Sciences in 2019 indicated that rainy season is starting later as a result of climate change, putting subsistence farmers and indigenous people in poor communities at risk of food shortages resulting from poor harvests.

Ecosystems 
Populations of Guatemala's edible giant winged leaf-cutter ant are declining. "Guatemala's zompopos, yellow ants, of May are now the zompopos of June," according to Dr. Edwin Castellanos, of the Universidad del Valle de Guatemala.

Impacts on people

Economic impacts

Agriculture 
Guatemalan farmers have experienced extreme weather events such as hurricanes, as well as erratic weather patterns with spikes and drops in temperature, torrential rains, drought, and unexpected frost. One crop affected has been potatoes, which suffer from fungus.

Guatemala's western highlands are particularly susceptible to climate change, impacting the region’s predominantly indigenous population of subsistence farmers. The main crops, potatoes and maize, have been under increasing pressure as hard frosts in the region have become more frequent since 2013. Hard frosts can kill a whole season’s worth of crops at once. At lower elevations, new pests are becoming more prevalent and there has been decreased rainfall.

The problem of food security and famine has increased, especially in the “corredor seco" (an area extending from the departments of Izabal and Baja Verapaz in the north to Santa Rosa and Jutiapa in the south).

Impacts on migration 
In 2018, 50% of the 94,000 Guatemalans deported from the United States and Mexico were from the country's western highlands severely affected by climate change.

In 2019, Palm Beach County, Florida saw an increase in Guatemalan immigrants from the "Dry corridor", seeking to escape hunger caused by periods of drought followed by torrential rains that had impacted their crops.

Mitigation and adaptation

Adaptation 
US humanitarian aid for projects related climate and agriculture has focused on helping farmers adapt so that they can remain on their land. USAID support for Guatemala has included development of "early-warning systems for floods and fires, as well as promoting soil and watershed conservation, rain water harvesting, and other adaptive practices." According to the GAO, the mandate for studies to determine the impact of these programs on migration has been rescinded. A third round of cuts to US aid has been proposed for FY2020.

US based NGOs which have been active in climate-related projects in the forestry and agricultural sectors have experienced funding cuts under the Trump Administration. For example, Asociación de Cooperación para el Desarrollo Rural de Occidente (C.D.R.O.) was a Guatemalan program originally funded by the United States’ government. C.D.R.O. focused on agroforestry and weather monitoring systems to help farmers mitigate the effects of climate change. The organization provided residents with resources to plant new, more adaptable crops to alongside their typical maize to protect the corn from variable temperatures, frost, etc. C.D.R.O. also set up a weather monitoring system to help predict extreme weather events, and would send residents text messages to warn them about periods of frost, extreme heat, humidity, or drought. Funding for the program was cut by the Trump administration in 2017.

International cooperation 
Guatemala has joined the V20, a group of 48 developing economies working together with development banks towards climate resilience and 100% renewable energy.

See also 

Climate of Guatemala
 Central American dry corridor 
Central American migrant caravans
Climate refugees

References

External links 
Guatemala, Climate Change Adaptation, United Nations Development Programme
Guatemala, Climate Links, USAID

Environment of Guatemala
Guatemala